The Pepsi fruit juice flood was a flood of 176,000 barrels (28 million litres; 7.4 million US gallons) of fruit and vegetable juices into the streets of Lebedyan, Russia, and the Don River, caused by the collapse of a PepsiCo warehouse.

History
On April 25, 2017, a PepsiCo warehouse's roof collapsed unexpectedly. The warehouse was located in Lebedyan, the centre of Pepsi's operations in Russia, and operated by the PepsiCo subsidiary Lebedyansky. The warehouse contained a variety of fruit and vegetable juices. The collapse of the roof caused two minor injuries and sent 28 million litres (7.4 million US gallons) of juices into the streets of Lebedyan and the Don River. However, no deaths resulted from the spill.

There was some concern that the juices might have damaged the aquatic ecosystem of the Don River, but water samples showed no evidence of environmental damage caused by the spill. 

PepsiCo officials apologised for the incident, offered to pay for all damages caused, and stated that they were working with local officials to determine the cause of the warehouse collapse.

See also 
 List of non-water floods

References

External links 
 Video of the Pepsi fruit juice flood

2017 industrial disasters
2017 disasters in Russia
2017 floods in Europe
Engineering failures
Floods in Russia
April 2017 events in Russia
Lipetsk Oblast
PepsiCo
Food processing disasters